Puerto Guzmán is a town and municipality located in the Putumayo Department, Republic of Colombia.

Climate
Puerto Guzmán has a very wet tropical rainforest climate (Köppen Af).

References

Municipalities of Putumayo Department